Tiset is a small village area in Rindal Municipality in Trøndelag county, Norway. The village lies along the river Tiåa, a tributary of the large Surna river. The Øvre Rindal Chapel is located in the small village.

References

Rindal
Villages in Trøndelag